Jeff Stevenson (born Jeffrey Stevens; 3 March 1961, Hammersmith, England) is an English comedian and actor. Stevenson's career first began when he appeared in the 1976 film Bugsy Malone, playing the part of Fat Sam's Hoodlum Louis.

Career
Stevenson was born in 1961 in Hammersmith, London. He attended Barbara Speake Stage School in his teens and Phil Collins' mother June was his first agent.

He later played the Stag comedian at Rodney Trotter's stag night on Only Fools and Horses, and also played PC Parker in To Hull and Back, a Christmas Day film of Only Fools and Horses. He regularly performed the rôle of 'warm up' act for studio recordings of Only Fools and Horses.

Stevenson hosted the ITV series Knees Up, a variety show set in a London pub that was a follow on from the first series hosted by Chas & Dave. Stevenson also hosted the ITV daytime game show Jumble which ran for two series in 1991 and 1992.

Stevenson starred in the 2020 Joe Wenbourne film Touching the Blue. The film won worldwide accolades, including an award for Stevenson for best feature actor in the Los Angeles World Premiere Film Awards.

Jeff has his own website.

References

1961 births
Living people
English male comedians
Pisces (constellation)